Muhamed Mujić (25 April 1933 – 20 February 2016) was a Yugoslav footballer of Bosnian ethnicity. 

Mujić played for Velež Mostar for most of his career and made his international debut in an April 1956 Central European International Cup match against Hungary. He was a silver medalist at the 1956 Summer Olympics. At the 1962 FIFA World Cup in Chile, he broke Soviet defender Eduard Dubinsky's leg, partially causing his death seven years later. Although West German referee Albert Dusch took no action, Mujić was sent home by the Yugoslav football federation, never to be called up again. In total, from 1956 to 1962, he scored 17 goals for the national team in 32 appearances.

International goals

External links

References

1933 births
2016 deaths
Sportspeople from Mostar
Association football forwards
Bosnia and Herzegovina footballers
Yugoslav footballers
Yugoslavia international footballers
Olympic footballers of Yugoslavia
Footballers at the 1956 Summer Olympics
Medalists at the 1956 Summer Olympics
Olympic silver medalists for Yugoslavia
Olympic medalists in football
1960 European Nations' Cup players
1962 FIFA World Cup players
FK Velež Mostar players
FC Girondins de Bordeaux players
GNK Dinamo Zagreb players
K. Beringen F.C. players
Yugoslav First League players
Yugoslav Second League players
Ligue 1 players
Belgian Pro League players
Yugoslav expatriate footballers
Expatriate footballers in France
Yugoslav expatriate sportspeople in France
Expatriate footballers in Belgium
Yugoslav expatriate sportspeople in Belgium
Yugoslav football managers
FK Velež Mostar managers